Barbara Haas and Katarzyna Kawa were the defending champions but chose not to participate.

Anastasia Dețiuc and Katarina Zavatska won the title, defeating Lina Gjorcheska and Irina Khromacheva in the final, 6–4, 6–7(5–7), [11–9].

Seeds

Draw

Draw

References
Main Draw

Zagreb Ladies Open - Doubles